Hannelore Knuts (born 4 November 1977) is a Belgian actress and fashion model who began modeling in the late 90s. According to Vanity Fair, " She started modeling for Branquinho and Simons shortly after being spotted at the Antwerp train station, and would go on to model for Gucci and Chanel."

She has appeared on the cover of Vogue seven times: five times on the Italian edition, and once each on the South Korean and Japanese editions. Her 2011-12 film credits include Nicolas Provost's The Invader and the Radio Soulwax project Dave, in which she plays the title role of David Bowie.

She has collaborated on art projects with several artists, including a project in 2011 where video artists applied 365 layers of makeup to her face. She served as the model for Michaël Borremans's painting The Angel.

References

External links

 
 
 

1977 births
Living people
Belgian female models
People from Hasselt
Belgian film actresses
Elite Model Management models